Cichostów  is a village in the administrative district of Gmina Milanów, within Parczew County, Lublin Voivodeship, in eastern Poland.

References

Villages in Parczew County